Han Jin-sook  (born 15 December 1979) is a South Korean women's international footballer who plays as a midfielder. She is a member of the South Korea women's national football team. She was part of the team at the 2003 FIFA Women's World Cup. On club level she plays for Daekyo Kangaroos in South Korea.

International goals

Honors

International 
 EAFF Women's Football Championship: 2005

References

External links
 Han Jin-sook at the Korea Football Association (KFA)
 

1979 births
Living people
South Korean women's footballers
South Korea women's international footballers
Place of birth missing (living people)
2003 FIFA Women's World Cup players
Women's association football midfielders